The 68th edition of the Kuurne–Brussels–Kuurne cycling classic was held on 28 February 2016. It was part of the 2016 UCI Europe Tour and ranked as a 1.HC event. It was the second and concluding race of the Belgian opening weekend, the year's first road races in Northwestern Europe, one day after Omloop Het Nieuwsblad.

Belgian Jasper Stuyven won the race after a 17 km solo.

Hills in the race

Results

External links

References

Kuurne–Brussels–Kuurne
Kuurne-Brussels-Kuurne
Kuurne-Brussels-Kuurne